Sodimac Homecenter is a chain of home improvement stores in Chile. 

Besides Chile, there are stores in Argentina, Colombia, Peru, Mexico, Uruguay, and Brazil.

In March 2015 Sodimac opened the doors to the public of its first store in Uruguay; in June of the same year its first store opened in São Paulo, Brazil and in April 2016 announced the arrival in Mexico together with the local supermarket chain Soriana.

History
It is owned and operated by Falabella. There are 40 locations in Argentina, Brazil, Chile, Peru, Colombia, Uruguay and Mexico. 

The company plans doubling its presence in America by 2010. In 2018, the company announced that it will invest $220 million into technology and expansion.

References

External links
Official Website
Home Renovation

Home improvement
Hardware_stores
Retail companies of Chile
Retail companies established in 1952
Chilean companies established in 1952
Falabella (retail store)